François-Nicolas Delaistre (Paris 9 March 1746 – 23 April 1832 Paris) was a French sculptor.

Delaistre was educated by Félix Lecomte and Louis-Claude Vassé. Delaistre won the Prix de Rome in 1772; he studied a year at the École royale des élèves protégés at the French Academy and later at the Académie de France in Rome between 1773 and 1777. It was there that he probably first met the architect Pierre-Adrien Pâris, with whom he later collaborated. His best-known work, the group Cupid and Psyche, was originally executed in Rome (the later marble version is in the Louvre at Paris).

The Nuttall Encyclopedia mentions "Delaistre, a French statuary, born in Paris (1836-1891)": this may be a relative of François Delaistre.

References

Further reading
Marie-Nicolas Bouillet & Alexis Chassang (dir.), « François Delaistre » in Dictionnaire universel d’histoire et de géographie, 1878
Catalogue d'exposition, Skulptur aus dem Louvre. Sculptures françaises néo-classiques. 1760 - 1830, Paris, musée du Louvre, 23 mai - 3 septembre 1990, p. 315.

External links
 

18th-century French sculptors
French male sculptors
19th-century French sculptors
Prix de Rome for sculpture
1746 births
1832 deaths
Artists from Paris
19th-century French male artists
18th-century French male artists